Costantino Maria Attilio Barneschi (born 24 Jun 1892 in Foiano della Chiana) was an Italian clergyman and bishop for the Roman Catholic Diocese of Manzini. He was ordained in 1951. He was appointed in 1965. He died in 1953.

References 

Italian Roman Catholic bishops
1892 births
1965 deaths